George Creek may refer to:

George Creek (Alberta), a stream in Canada
George Creek (Asotin Creek), a stream in the U.S. state of Washington

See also
 Georges Creek (disambiguation)